Gold Rush: Maybe One Day is the third studio album by the American Christian hip hop musician Dre Murray. Released on July 9, 2013 by Collision Records, it reached No. 189 on the Billboard 200.

Critical reception

Gold Rush: Maybe One Day received three positive reviews from music critics. At AllMusic, Andy Kellman rated the album four stars, writing, "Murray offers his strongest and most focused solo set yet." Dwayne Lacy of New Release Tuesday rated the album four-and-a-half stars, writing that "Dre keeps it real and relevant" with this release full of "masterful production and heavy lyrical content". At Christian Music Zine, Anthony Peronto rated the album a perfect five stars, saying, "With no filler tracks, generic trap beats, or any hype songs made for workout sessions this isn't an album for the casual listen" because "Dre Murray has made one of the best albums of the year and it's a mature work that deserves attention."

Chart performance
For the Billboard charting week of July 27, 2013, Gold Rush: Maybe One Day charted at No. 189 on the Billboard 200, No. 8 and 6 on the Christian Albums and Top Gospel Albums charts, respectively, No. 15 on the Rap Albums, and No. 38 on the Independent Albums chart.

Track listing

Charts

References

2013 albums
Dre Murray albums